Metromania is the twelfth studio album by German rock band Eloy, which was released in 1984 and featured artwork by Rodney Matthews. After the album's poor reception, the band took a four-year-long hiatus.

Track listing

Personnel

Eloy
 Frank Bornemann — guitar, lead vocals, lyrics, production
 Klaus Peter Matziol — bass
 Hannes Folberth — keyboards
 Hannes Arkona — guitar, keyboards, vocoder, syncussion, synthesized drums
 Fritz Randow — drums

Additional Personnel
 Kalle Bosel — backing vocals
 Jane "Janie" James — backing vocals
 Sabine Matziol — backing vocals
 Rainer Przywara — backing vocals
 Romy Singh — backing vocals
 Susanne — backing vocals

References 

1984 albums
Eloy (band) albums
Albums with cover art by Rodney Matthews